Brian Bram (born May 9, 1955, in Chicago), raised in Deerfield, Illinois, played a minor role in the underground comix movement with his contributions to American Splendor, the comic book series written and published by Harvey Pekar.

Biography 
Bram's first paid illustration job was a logo for a local rock band. At 17 he began contributing to Triad, a Chicago-based alternative magazine that published work by Skip Williamson and others. At 18 Bram served briefly as art director for the magazine.

Bram moved to Cleveland in 1975 to major in design and illustration at the Cleveland Institute of Art. According to the Comiclopedia, underground cartoonist Jay Lynch introduced him to Pekar who hired him to illustrate stories in the first issue of American Splendor. Bram contributed to the first two issues of American Splendor, along with artists Gary Dumm, Greg Budgett, and Robert Crumb. He provided the art for "Remembering Be-Ins" in American Splendor #1 (1976) and "Rollins on Mars," "May 4–5, 1970," and "Zoology" in American Splendor #2 (1977). In 1980 he moved to Rochester, New York, to study film and animation at the Rochester Institute of Technology.

In 1983 Bram produced and hosted an all-night movie program on WUHF (Channel 31; then an independent station; now part of the Fox network). In addition to movies, the program was a forum for local bands including Personal Effects, The Degrads, and Cousin Al and the Relatives. 

Since 1987 Bram has been living in Boston, Massachusetts and working as a creative director in the interactive industry.

Further reading
 Comic Books as History, Joseph Witek, 1989, University Press of Mississippi. 
 Diners of New England, Randy Garbin, 2005, Stackpole Books. 
 R. Crumb Checklist, Don Fiene, 1981, Bookpeople. 
 The Catalog of Cool, Gene Sculatti. 1982, Warner Books.

References

External links
 
 Triad Radio air check, 1972
 Complete list of Harvey Pekar's artists
 Bram at Linked In
 

Underground artists
Alternative cartoonists
Underground cartoonists
1955 births
Living people
Rochester Institute of Technology alumni
People from Deerfield, Illinois
American Splendor artists